Éric Elena (born August 6, 1962) is a Monégasque politician. He was elected to the National Council as the sole politician from the Renaissance party in the 2013 Monegasque election. He is also president of the Monaco Basketball Association.

References

Living people
1962 births
Members of the National Council (Monaco)